= María Josefa Zapata =

María Josefa Zapata (1822 – 1870), was a Spanish printer and publisher.

She was active as a journalist at the El meteoro of Cádiz from 1846, and became known as a pioneer Spanish socialist feminist, engaged in women's rights and workers rights.

She was the founder of the feminist publication El Pensil de Iberia.
